Sify Technologies Limited (formerly Satyam Infoway) is an Indian information and communications technology company providing end-to-end ICT solutions including telecom services, data center services, cloud & managed services, transformation integration services and application integration services. Sify Technologies Limited played an important role during the early spread of Internet and e-commerce in India. It has been listed on NASDAQ as SIFY since October, 1999. Merrill Lynch was the underwriter for Sify's IPO on the NASDAQ. Sify was founded and led to IPO by R. Ramaraj.

History
In November 1999, Sify paid  crore for a 24.5% stake in IndiaWorld Communications. It acquired the remaining shares for  crore on 30 June 2000.

In 2000, Sify sponsored the India Olympics team. In March 2002, Sify made an agreement with Makemytrip to run Sify's travel portal. In January 2002, Sify announced prizes for most emails sent under a 6-week contest called "Sify Greenmail", promoting emails as an ecofriendly way of communication.

Sify used to run the i-way chain of Internet cafes. In 2002, Sify introduced wireless last mile connections with speeds up to 256 kbit/s. By August 2003, it had over 1,000 i-Way cyber cafes in India. In December 2003, Sify launched video-conferencing facilities in its Internet cafes.

In 2004, Sify, with Level Up Games, launched a MMORPG. In June 2004, the Supreme Court of India set a legal precedent regarding domain names in the Satyam Infoway Ltd. v. Sifynet Solutions Pvt. Ltd. lawsuit.

In November 2005, Satyam Computer Services sold its remaining 31.61% shares in Sify to Infinity Capital Ventures, which is owned by Raju Vegesna, for  million.

See also 

 Satyam Infoway Ltd. v. Sifynet Solutions Pvt. Ltd.
 Mahindra Satyam

References

External links
 

Information technology companies of India
Companies established in 1995